Vireaux is a commune in the Yonne department in Bourgogne-Franche-Comté in north-central France.

Notable people
 Jean-Baptiste Muard (1809 - 1854), French Benedictine, reformer, and founder of religious orders, was born in Vireaux.

See also
Communes of the Yonne department

References

Communes of Yonne